Henri Barbenés (20 November 1885 – 27 December 1969) was a French rower. Barbenés started for El Salvador at the 1904 European Rowing Championships in single scull and won a silver medal. He competed in the men's eight event at the 1920 Summer Olympics for France.

References

External links
 

1885 births
1969 deaths
French male rowers
Olympic rowers of France
Rowers at the 1920 Summer Olympics
Place of birth missing
European Rowing Championships medalists